Kompolje may refer to several places in Slovenia: 

Kompolje, Dobrepolje, a settlement in the Municipality of Dobrepolje
Kompolje, Lukovica, a settlement in the Municipality of Lukovica
Kompolje, Sevnica, a settlement in the Municipality of Sevnica
Male Kompolje, a settlement in the Municipality of Ivančna Gorica
Velike Kompolje, a settlement in the Municipality of Ivančna Gorica